Antoine Michel Filhol, a French engraver, born in Paris in 1759, was instructed by F. D. Née. He was very successful in depicting landscapes, and published several works on art, among which the most noted is the Galerie du Musée Napoléon publié par Filhol, graveur (Paris, 1804–1815), 10 vols., of which the earliest issues carried the title Cours historique et élémentaire de peinture, ou Galerie complette ... (etc.). He died in Paris 5 May 1812.

References
 

1759 births
1812 deaths
18th-century engravers
19th-century engravers
French engravers
Artists from Paris
Landscape artists